Nazi eugenics refers to the social policies of eugenics in Nazi Germany, composed of various pseudoscientific ideas about genetics. The racial ideology of Nazism placed the biological improvement of the German people by selective breeding of "Nordic" or "Aryan" traits at its center. These policies were used to justify the involuntary sterilization and mass-murder of those deemed "undesirable".

Eugenics research in Germany before and during the Nazi period was similar to that in the United States (particularly California), by which it had been heavily inspired. However, its prominence rose sharply under Adolf Hitler's leadership when wealthy Nazi supporters started heavily investing in it. The programs were subsequently shaped to complement Nazi racial policies.

Those targeted for murder under Nazi eugenics policies were largely people living in private and state-operated institutions, identified as "life unworthy of life". They included prisoners, degenerates, dissidents, and people with congenital cognitive and physical disabilitiespeople who were considered to be feeble-minded. In fact being diagnosed with "feeblemindedness" (}) was the main label approved in forced sterilization, which included people who were diagnosed by a doctor as, or otherwise seemed to be:

 Epileptic
 Schizophrenic
 Manic-depressive (now known as bipolar)
 Cerebral palsy or muscular dystrophy
 Deaf and/or blind
 Homosexual or "transvestites" (which at the time was used to refer to intersex and transgender people, particularly trans women)
 Anyone else considered to be idle, insane, and/or weak as per "feeblemindedness"

All of these were targeted for elimination from the chain of heredity. More than 400,000 people were sterilized against their will, while up to 300,000 were murdered under the Aktion T4 euthanasia program. Thousands more also died from complications of the forced surgeries, the majority being women from forced tubal ligations. 
In June 1935, Hitler and his cabinet made a list of seven new decrees, in which number 5 was to speed up the investigations of sterilization.

In German, the concept of "eugenics" was mostly known under the term of Rassenhygiene or "racial hygiene". The loanword Eugenik was in occasional use, as was its closer loan-translation of Erbpflege. An alternative term was Volksaufartung (approximately "racial improvement").

Relationship with the U.S. eugenics movement

The early German eugenics movement was led by Wilhelm Schallmayer and Alfred Ploetz. Henry Friedlander wrote that although the German and American eugenics movements were similar, the German movement was more centralized and did not contain as many diverse ideas as the American movement.  Unlike the American movement, one publication and one society, the German Society for Racial Hygiene, represented all eugenicists.

Edwin Black wrote that after the eugenics movement was well established in the United States, it was spread to Germany. California eugenicists began producing literature promoting eugenics and sterilization and sending it overseas to German scientists and medical professionals.  By 1933, California had subjected more people to forceful sterilization than all other U.S. states combined. The forced sterilization program engineered by the Nazis was partly inspired by California's.

In 1927, the Kaiser Wilhelm Institute for Anthropology (KWIA), an organization which concentrated on physical and social anthropology as well as human genetics, was founded in Berlin with significant financial support from the American philanthropic group, the Rockefeller Foundation. German professor of medicine, anthropology and eugenics Eugen Fischer was the director of this organization, a man whose work helped provide the scientific basis for the Nazis' eugenics policies. The Rockefeller Foundation even funded some of the research conducted by Josef Mengele before he went to Auschwitz.

Upon returning from Germany in 1934, where more than 5,000 people per month were being forcibly sterilized, the California eugenics leader C. M. Goethe bragged to a colleague:

Eugenics researcher Harry H. Laughlin often bragged that his Model Eugenic Sterilization laws had been implemented in the 1935 Nuremberg racial hygiene laws. In 1936, Laughlin was invited to an award ceremony at Heidelberg University in Germany (scheduled on the anniversary of Hitler's 1934 purge of Jews from the Heidelberg faculty), to receive an honorary doctorate for his work on the "science of racial cleansing". Due to financial limitations, Laughlin was unable to attend the ceremony and had to pick it up from the Rockefeller Institute. Afterwards, he proudly shared the award with his colleagues, remarking that he felt that it symbolized the "common understanding of German and American scientists of the nature of eugenics."

Hitler's views on eugenics

Adolf Hitler read about racial hygiene during his imprisonment in Landsberg Prison.

Hitler believed the nation had become weak, corrupted by dysgenics, the infusion of degenerate elements into its bloodstream.

The racialism and idea of competition, termed social Darwinism in 1944, were discussed by European scientists and also in the Vienna press during the 1920s. Where Hitler picked up the ideas is uncertain. The theory of evolution had been generally accepted in Germany at the time, but this sort of extremism was rare.

In his Second Book, which was unpublished during the Nazi era, Hitler praised Sparta, (using ideas perhaps borrowed from Ernst Haeckel), adding that he considered Sparta to be the first "Völkisch State". He endorsed what he perceived to be an early eugenics treatment of deformed children:

Nazi eugenics program

In organizing their eugenics program the Nazis were inspired by the United States' programs of forced sterilization, especially on the eugenics laws that had been enacted in California.

The Law for the Prevention of Hereditarily Diseased Offspring, enacted on July 14, 1933, allowed the compulsory sterilisation of any citizen who according to the opinion of a "Genetic Health Court" "suffered" from a list of alleged genetic disorders and required physicians to register every case of hereditary illness known to them, except in women over 45 years of age. Physicians could be fined for failing to comply.

In 1934, the first year of the Law's operation, nearly 4,000 people appealed against the decisions of sterilization authorities. A total of 3,559 of the appeals failed. By the end of the Nazi regime, over 200 Hereditary Health Courts were created, and under their rulings over 400,000 persons were sterilized against their will.

Nazi eugenics institutions

The Hadamar Clinic was a mental hospital in the German town of Hadamar used by the Nazi-controlled German government as the site of Action T4. The Kaiser Wilhelm Institute of Anthropology, Human Heredity, and Eugenics was founded in 1927. Hartheim Killing Facility was also part of the euthanasia programme where the Nazis murdered individuals they deemed disabled. At first, patients were transported in gas vans, where passengers were poisoned or asphyxiated using the engine exhaust during transit. Gas chambers were developed later and used pure carbon monoxide gas to murder the patients.
In its early years, and during the Nazi era, the Clinic was strongly associated with theories of eugenics and racial hygiene advocated by its leading theorists Fritz Lenz and Eugen Fischer, and by its director Otmar von Verschuer. Under Fischer, the sterilization of so-called Rhineland Bastards was undertaken. Grafeneck Castle was one of Nazi Germany's killing centers, and today it is a memorial place dedicated to the victims of Aktion T4.

Identification

The Law for Simplification of the Health System of July 1934 created Information Centers for Genetic and Racial Hygiene, as well as Health Offices. The law also described procedures for 'denunciation' and 'evaluation' of persons, who were then sent to a Genetic Health Court where sterilization was decided.

Information to determine who was considered 'genetically sick' was gathered from routine information supplied by people to doctor's offices and welfare departments. Standardized questionnaires had been designed by Nazi officials with the help of Dehomag (a subsidiary of IBM in the 1930s), so that the information could be encoded easily onto Hollerith punch cards for fast sorting and counting.

In Hamburg, doctors gave information into a Central Health Passport Archive, under something called the 'Health-Related Total Observation of Life'. This file was to contain reports from doctors, but also courts, insurance companies, sports clubs, the Hitler Youth, the military, the labor service, colleges, etc. Any institution that gave information would get information back in return. In 1940, the Reich Interior Ministry tried to impose a Hamburg-style system on the whole Reich.

Nazi eugenics policies regarding marriage
After the Nazis passed the Nuremberg Laws in 1935, it became compulsory for both marriage partners to be tested for hereditary diseases in order to preserve the perceived racial purity of the Aryan race. Everyone was encouraged to carefully evaluate his or her prospective marriage partner eugenically during courtship. Members of the SS were cautioned to carefully interview prospective marriage partners to make sure they had no family history of hereditary disease or insanity, but to do this carefully so as not to hurt the feelings of the prospective fiancée and, if it became necessary to reject her for eugenic reasons, to do it tactfully and not cause her any offense.

Nazi abortion policies 
The Nazi's policies on abortions were conceived of alongside the general Nazi eugenics program. Upon coming to power, the Nazis restricted advertisements on the sale of contraceptives. In May 1933, the Nazis reintroduced earlier laws outlawing the advertisement of abortion procedures and abortifacients to the public. In September of the same year, the Berlin Council of Physicians warned its members that "proceedings will be taken against every evil-doer who dares to injure our sacred healthy race." Abortion procedures were placed under strict political control. Abortions for eugenic reasons were also prohibited during this period, but in some hereditary health courts such abortions were exempt from punishment. (This consideration extended to the exemption of punishment for a Jewish couple who attempted to procure an abortion in 1938, on the basis that the law did not protect Jewish embryos.)

See also

 Doctors' trial
 Elfriede Lohse-Wächtler
 German Blood Certificate
 German Society for Racial Hygiene
 Lebensborn
 Nazi human experimentation
 Nazism and race
 Nordic theory
 Nur für Deutsche
 Physicians in the Nazi Party
 Racial policy of Nazi Germany
 Racial purity
 Rassenschande
 Reich Citizenship Law
 Reinrassig
 Sterilization of deaf people in Nazi Germany
 Volksdeutsche
 Volksliste

References
Notes

Bibliography
Books
Aly, G. (1994). Cleansing the Fatherland: Nazi Medicine and Racial Hygiene. The Johns Hopkins University Press. 
Baer, E. et al. (2003). Experience and Expression: Women, the Nazis, and the Holocaust. Wayne State University Press. 
Baumslag, N. (2005).  Murderous Medicine: Nazi Doctors, Human Experimentation, and Typhus. Praeger Publishers. 
Biesold, H. (1999). Crying Hands: Eugenics and Deaf People in Nazi Germany. Washington, D.C.: Gallaudet University Press. 
Burleigh, M. (1991). The Racial State: Germany 1933-1945. Cambridge University Press. 
Burleigh, M. (1994). Death and Deliverance: 'Euthanasia' in Germany, c.1900 to 1945. Cambridge University Press. 
Caplan, A. (1992). When Medicine Went Mad: Bioethics and the Holocaust. Totowa, New Jersey: Humana Press. 
 Conroy, M. (2017). Nazi Eugenics: Precursors, Policy, Aftermath. Columbia University Press. 
 Ehrenreich, Eric. The Nazi Ancestral Proof: Genealogy, Racial Science, and the Final Solution. Bloomington, Indiana: Indiana University Press, 2007. 
Evans, Suzanne E. (2004). Forgotten Crimes: The Holocaust and People with Disabilities. Chicago: Ivan R. Dee.  
Friedlander, H. (1995). The Origins of Nazi Genocide. From Euthanasia to the Final Solution. University of North Carolina Press. 
Gallagher, G. (1995). By Trust Betrayed: Patients, Physicians, and the License to Kill in the Third Reich. Arlington, Virginia: Vandamere Press. 
Glass, J. (1999). Life Unworthy of Life: Racial Phobia and Mass Murder in Hitler's Germany Basic Books. 
Kater, M. (1989). Doctors Under Hitler. Chapel Hill: University of North Carolina Press. 
Kuhl, S. (2002). The Nazi Connection: Eugenics, American Racism, and German National Socialism. Oxford University Press. 
Kuntz, D. (2006). Deadly Medicine: Creating the Master Race. The University of North Carolina Press. 
Lifton, R. (1986). THE NAZI DOCTORS: Medical Killing and the Psychology of Genocide. Basic Books. 
McFarland-Icke, B. (1999). Nurses in Nazi Germany: Moral Choice in History. Princeton University Press. 
Müller-Hill, B. (1998). Murderous Science: Elimination by Scientific Selection of Jews, Gypsies, and Others in Germany, 1933-1945. Plainview, New York: Cold Spring Harbor Laboratory Press. 
Nicosia, F. et al. (2002). Medicine and Medical Ethics in Nazi Germany: Origins, Practices, Legacies. Berghahn Books. 
Proctor, R. (2003). Racial Hygiene: Medicine Under the Nazis. Harvard University Press. 
Ryan, Donna F., et al. (2002). Deaf People in Hitler's Europe. Washington, D.C.: Gallaudet University Press, 
Schafft, G. (2004). From Racism to Genocide: Anthropology in the Third Reich. University of Illinois Press. 
Spitz, V. (2005).  Doctors from Hell: The Horrific Account of Nazi Experiments on Humans. Sentient Publications. 
Snyder, S. & D. Mitchell. (2006). Cultural Locations of Disability. University of Michigan Press. 
Weindling, P.J. (2005). Nazi Medicine and the Nuremberg Trials: From Medical War Crimes to Informed Consent. Palgrave Macmillan. 
Weindling, P.J. (1989). Health, Race and German Politics between National Unification and Nazism, 1870-1945. Cambridge University Press. 

Academic articles

Knittel, Suzanne., "Remembering Euthanasia: Grafeneck in the Past, Present, and Future", B. Niven & C. Paver [eds.]. Memorialization in Germany Since 1945.  New York: Palgrave MacMillan, 2010: 124-133, 30.
König, Malte, "Racism within the Axis: Sexual Intercourse and Marriage Plans between Italians and Germans, 1940–3". Journal of Contemporary History 54 (3), 2019, pp. 508-526.
Martin III, Matthew D., "The Dysfunctional Progeny of Eugenics: Autonomy Gone AWOL", Cardozo Journal of International Law, Vol. 15, No. 2, Fall 2007, pp. 371–421, .

Strous, R. D. (2006). "Nazi Euthanasia of the Mentally Ill at Hadamar". American Journal of Psychiatry January 2006; 163: 27.

"Eugenical Sterilization in Germany" Eugenical News 1933, Cold Spring Harbor Laboratory; vol.18:5.

Documentaries
Burleigh, M. (1991). Selling Murder: The Killing Films of the Third Reich. London: Domino Films.
Michalczyk, J.J. (1997). Nazi Medicine: In The Shadow Of The Reich''. New York: First-Run Features.

External links

General reference
Ethics Of Using Medical Data From Nazi Experiments
Medical Experiments of the Holocaust and Nazi Medicine
Sterilization Law in Germany
The History Museum - Nazi Euthanasia
Victims of the Nazi Era
Nazi Medicine by Michael Berenbaum

United States Holocaust Memorial Museum
Nazi Racial Science
Deadly medicine
Euthanasia program
Mentally and physically handicapped
Nazi Persecution of the Disabled

Ableism